Solariella amabilis is a species of sea snail, a marine gastropod mollusk in the family Solariellidae.

Description
(Original description by Jeffreys) The height of the shell attains 8 mm, its diameter 7 mm. The pure pearl-white, pyramidal shell is moderately solid. It is semitransparent, of a pearly and partially iridescent luster. Its sculpture shows two spiral ridges or keels on the upper part of each of the last three or four whorls, and one on the upper part of the next or smaller whorl, besides several finer but irregular ridges on the base of the last or largest whorl, and numerous minute spiral striae between all the ridges. The principal ridges are placed near the suture of each whorl, both above and below, leaving a broad flattened space in the middle and a narrow excavated space below the suture, thus imparting a tower-like appearance to the shell. The upper whorls are also marked with numerous short and fine longitudinal ribs, which cross the ridges and make them crenelated. The spire is elevated. The apex is semiglobose, prominent and slightly twisted. The seven whorls increase gradually in size. The suture is very distinct. The aperture is nearly circular, but angulated or somewhat notched below by the umbilical ridge. The outer lip is thin and slightly expanded. The inner lip is folded a little back on the umbilicus, and adheres to the columella. Inside, the shell is more or less iridescent. The umbilicus is large but not wide, funnel-shaped, and completely exposing the whole of the inner spire. It is encircled outside by a strong spiral ridge, which is often beaded, and winds like a staircase into the interior. The operculum forms a spiral of about a dozen whorls, the edges of which are imbricated and overlap one another in succession.

(Description as Solariella affinis) The whitish-pearly, thin shell is broadly umbilicated. It has a conoidal shape. The 5 convex whorls are separated by a gradate suture. They are ornamented with oblique, dense regular radiating costellae, and two spiral lirae on the lower part. The body whorl is ventricose, radiately costellate above, with three acute elevated median spiral cinguli, beneath with obsolete concentric striae. The umbilicus is wide, carinated at the periphery, plicate, and denticulate. The aperture is subcircular.

This marine species is finely and closely reticulated ; the whorls are rounded and show no trace of angularity. The umbilicus is not encircled by a keel.

Distribution

References

 Friele H., 1877: Preliminary report on the Mollusca from the Norwegian North Atlantic Expedition in 1876; Nyt Magazin for Naturvidenskaberne 23: 1–10, 1 pl.
 Warén, A. (1993). New and little known mollusca from Iceland and Scandinavia, Part 2. Sarsia. 78: 159–201.
 Gofas, S.; Le Renard, J.; Bouchet, P. (2001). Mollusca, in: Costello, M.J. et al. (Ed.) (2001). European register of marine species: a check-list of the marine species in Europe and a bibliography of guides to their identification. Collection Patrimoines Naturels, 50: pp. 180–213

External links
 
 Jeffreys J. G., 1862–1869: British Conchology London, van Voorst; Vol. 1: pp. CXIV + 341 [1862]. Vol. 2: pp. 479 [1864] Il frontrespizio reca la data 1863 ma in effetti pubblicato nel 1864. Vol. 3: pp. 394 (1865). Vol. 4: pp. 487 (1867). Vol. 5: pp. 259 (1869) 
 Jeffreys, J. G. (1883). On the Mollusca procured during the 'Lightning' and 'Porcupine' expeditions 1868-70. (Part VI). Proceedings of the Zoological Society of London. 1882: 88-115, pl. 19, 20.
 Williams S.T., Smith L.M., Herbert D.G., Marshall B.A., Warén A., Kiel S., Dyal P., Linse K., Vilvens C. & Kano Y. (2013) Cenozoic climate change and diversification on the continental shelf and slope: evolution of gastropod diversity in the family Solariellidae (Trochoidea). Ecology and Evolution 3(4): 887–917
 Fischer, P. (1882-1883). Diagnoses d'espèces nouvelles de mollusques recueillis dans le cours des expéditions scientifiques de l'aviso "Le Travailleur" (1880 et 1881). Journal de Conchyliologie. 30: 49-53 
 Friele H. (1877) Tungebevæbningen hos de Norske Rhipidoglossa. Archiv for mathematik og naturvidenskab, 2: 199-317, pl. 1-5
  Gofas, S.; Luque, Á. A.; Templado, J.; Salas, C. (2017). A national checklist of marine Mollusca in Spanish waters. Scientia Marina. 81(2) : 241-254, and supplementary online material
 Williams S.T., Kano Y., Warén A. & Herbert D.G. (2020). Marrying molecules and morphology: first steps towards a reevaluation of solariellid genera (Gastropoda: Trochoidea) in the light of molecular phylogenetic studies. Journal of Molluscan Studies. 86(1): 1–26

amabilis
Gastropods described in 1865